Hugh Duff (1870 or 1871–1940) was a unionist politician in Northern Ireland.

Duff was the director of a linen manufacturing company.  He joined the Ulster Unionist Party and was elected to the Senate of Northern Ireland in 1937, serving until his death in 1940.

References

1870s births
1940 deaths
Members of the Senate of Northern Ireland 1937–1941
Ulster Unionist Party members of the Senate of Northern Ireland